is a private women's college in Kamakura, Kanagawa Prefecture, Japan. The school specializes in home economics and child care.

History
The Keihin Women's Housekeeping Science School was established in Kanagawa-ku, Yokohama in 1943 as a vocational school. It was relocated to the Iwase neighborhood of Kamakura in 1946. In 1950, it was chartered as the Keihin Women's University, and became the four-year Keihin Women's University in 1959. The present name was adopted in 1989.

Curriculum

Undergraduate
School of Home Economics
Department of Home Economics and Health Sciences
 Department of Nutritional Management
School of Child Studies
Department of Child Studies
Department of Child Psychology
School of Education
 Department of Education

Graduate
School of Child Studies
Department of Child Studies

External links
 Official website 

Educational institutions established in 1943
Private universities and colleges in Japan
Universities and colleges in Kanagawa Prefecture
Women's universities and colleges in Japan
Buildings and structures in Kamakura, Kanagawa
Western Metropolitan Area University Association
1943 establishments in Japan